David Labriola (born September 9, 1960) is an American politician who has served in the Connecticut House of Representatives from the 131st district since 2003.

References

1960 births
Living people
People from Naugatuck, Connecticut
Republican Party members of the Connecticut House of Representatives
21st-century American politicians